Hardscrabble is an unincorporated community in Coshocton County, in the U.S. state of Ohio.

References

Unincorporated communities in Coshocton County, Ohio
Unincorporated communities in Ohio